M.M.Warburg & CO (AG & Co.) KGaA is a German private bank, based in Hamburg. A family-owned bank, it was founded in 1798 by Banca Levi Kahana of Warburg and brothers Moses Marcus Warburg and Gerson Warburg, two members of the Warburg family. The bank was Aryanized under the Nazis. The Warburg family still owns the bank, continuing a more than 200-year legacy of private ownership.

History

Nazi era 
When the Nazis came to power in Germany in 1933, Jews were persecuted, and their property began being transferred to non-Jews. In 1938, the Nazis arrested and held hostage Dr. Fritz Moritz Warburg, former head of M. M. Warburg Co. The bank was Aryanized but its name remained unchanged. It was transformed from a family firm to a limited company, and new managers were brought in, notably Dr. Rudolf Brinckmann and Paul Wirtz.

Siegmund Warburg emigrated from Nazi Germany in 1934 and founded S. G. Warburg & Co. in London in 1946.

Postwar 
The bank rose to become one of the most powerful investment banks in the City during the 60s, 70s, and 80s and Warburg himself one of London's most preeminent and influential financiers of the era. The London subsidiary was sold to Swiss Bank Corporation in 1995 and is today a part of UBS. Some descendants immigrated to the United States, for business reasons and to escape the persecution, and established themselves there. They include banker Paul Warburg and his nephew Eric M. Warburg, founder of Warburg Pincus.

Recent acquisitions 
During recent years, the bank has grown through many acquisitions. It bought several German private banks such as Marcard, Stein & Co. in Hamburg, Carl F. Plump & CO AG in Bremen, Bankhaus Hallbaum AG in Hannover and Bankhaus Löbbecke in Berlin. Furthermore, there are the foreign subsidiaries M. M. Warburg Bank (Switzerland) AG and M. M. Warburg & CO Luxembourg S.A., as well as various mutual funds. Since 2009 the Schwäbische Bank AG in Stuttgart has been part of the Warburg Banking Group. In 2016 the former subsidiary banks Bankhaus Hallbaum, Bankhaus Löbbecke, Bankhaus Carl F. Plump & CO and Schwäbische Bank were amalgamated with M.M.Warburg & CO.

The bank's headquarters are located at Ferdinandstraße 75 in Hamburg, with additional offices in Frankfurt, Berlin, Munich and Cologne. The bank also maintains several offices in Zurich and Luxembourg.

Today, M.M.Warburg & CO's core business is in private banking, asset management, and investment banking, serving private, corporate and institutional clients.

Cum-Ex scandal 
The bank has been implicated in the Cum-Ex scandal, accused of defrauding taxpayers in excess of over 50 million euro. One of the leading players in cum-ex transactions, Hanno Berger, advised M.M.Warburg & CO, or the two main shareholders at the time, the chairman of the supervisory board Christian Olearius and his deputy, Max Warburg, on cum-ex transactions. According to a Spiegel report published in March 2021, Warburg paid 17.5 million euros to Hanno Berger and Benjamin Frey for advice on cum-ex deals. Warburg wired the money to Sarasin Bank, which routed it to an offshore firm owned by Berger and Frey in the British Virgin Islands. 

On January 12, 2022, the former managing director of a Warburg subsidiary in Luxembourg surprisingly confessed during a trial before the Bonn Regional Court ('third cum-ex criminal trial'). He is regarded as the Warburg Group's first confessed cum-ex actor.

The lawyer Gerhard Strate filed a complaint against Olaf Scholz and Peter Tschentscher in February 2022. The then mayor and now federal chancellor Scholz and the then finance senator and now mayor Tschentscher are accused of taking 47 million euros from M.M. Warburg & Co. not to have reclaimed. The sum had been reimbursed to the bank by the tax office in connection with cum-ex transactions. Strate accuses the politicians of aiding and abetting tax evasion.

Literature

 Massimo Bognanni (2022): Unter den Augen des Staates. Der größte Steuerraub in der Geschichte der Bundesrepublik. dtv ISBN 9783423283069

See also

S. G. Warburg & Co.
Warburg Family

References

External links
M.M.Warburg & CO Official website
Warburg Family
 

Banks of Germany
Companies based in Hamburg
Investment banks
Warburg family
1798 establishments in the Holy Roman Empire
Financial services companies established in 1798
Banks established in 1798
Private banks
German companies established in 1798